Bill Hader is an American actor, comedian, producer, voice actor, and writer. The following are his appearances in film, television and video games.

Film

Television

Video games

Music videos

References
 

American filmographies
Male actor filmographies